Chi-Ming Chow, FRCPC, FACC, FASE, is a Canadian cardiologist at St. Michael's Hospital in Toronto, Ontario, Canada. He is often interviewed on national media about issues involving cardiovascular health, and is regarded as an influential advocate for heart health in the Canadian Chinese community.

Career 
Chow is an attending staff cardiologist at St. Michael's Hospital, Toronto, Ontario, Canada. He is also a Professor in the Department of Medicine, University of Toronto. He has an undergraduate degree in computer science from Brown University, Providence, Rhode Island, USA. He completed his Doctor of Medicine degree in 1990 at McGill University, in Montréal, Québec and a Masters of Science in Epidemiology, also at McGill University, in 1997. He completed his residency training in family medicine, internal medicine and cardiology at McGill University. He then pursued a clinical and research echocardiography fellowship at the Massachusetts General Hospital, Boston, Massachusetts, USA.

He had won multiple local and national teaching awards to recognize his teaching and innovation in medical education. He is a winner of the Ruedy Award for Innovation in Medical Education presented by the Association of Faculties of Medicine of Canada and Dalhousie University Faculty of Medicine and the 2009 William Goldie Prize for Innovation by the Department of Medicine, University of Toronto.

He is currently a board member and media spokesperson for the Heart and Stroke Foundation of Ontario. To recognize his service to the Heart and Stroke Foundation of Ontario, he won the Award For Volunteer Excellence in 2007 and the Rick Gallop Award for Pioneering Leadership in 2008.

He participates actively in health promotion and research among ethnic Chinese in Canada. He was awarded the Best Community Service Award by the Association of Chinese Canadian Entrepreneurs in 2010.

Selected publications

Software 
Chow created a number of software packages for smartphones, including CardioMath (a calculator for commonly used formulas in cardiovascular medicine cardiology)

References

External links
 CardioMath Tool
 Canadian Cardiovascular Society Guideline Programs
 Heart & Stroke - Cardiovascular Health Among Chinese Canadians - Are We All Treated the Same?
 Heart & Stroke - Health of Immigrant Population (English)
 Heart & Stroke - Health of Immigrant Population (Chinese)

Living people
Canadian cardiologists
Canadian people of Chinese descent
20th-century Canadian physicians
McGill University Faculty of Medicine alumni
Brown University alumni
Year of birth missing (living people)
Scientists from Montreal
University of Toronto alumni
21st-century Canadian physicians